Bhupendra Kumar Modi (born 2 January 1949), known informally as Dr. M, is an Indian-born Singaporean businessman, social entrepreneur, and philanthropist. He is the founder-chairman of Smart Group of companies, the founder of the Global Citizen Forum and the global chairman of the Foreign Investors India Forum. He is also the Honorary President of the World Federation of United Nations Associations.

Early life and education
Modi is the son of Raibahadur Gujarmal Modi and Dayawati Modi. He graduated with a degree in chemical engineering from the Indian Institute of Technology (IIT-BHU) and received an MBA from the University of Southern California. He has been awarded a PhD. in Financial Management.

Career
In 1975, as a part of Modi Rubber, Modi made the first Indo-International technical collaboration in the tyre industry with Continental of Germany. In 1981, Modi established Graphics India, which became the sole distributor of Rank Xerox copiers in India, and formed Modi Xerox as a joint-venture with Xerox, setting up India's first office automation product manufacturing facility in Modipur, Rampur in the Indian state of Uttar Pradesh.

In 1987, Modi formed a joint-venture with Italian computer firm Olivetti. Modi Olivetti was the first Indian joint-venture to manufacture advanced PC's and floppy disks. He also entered into a joint venture with Alcatel in 1992; Alcatel Modi Network Systems was the first Indian private sector company to manufacture telecom equipment and export digital switching systems and to set up a GSM network in India.

In 1993, his company Modi Telstra became the first company to launch cellular services in India and received the first Telecom Engineering Commission Certification of Quality. The inaugural mobile call in India was made on the Modi Telstra network by the then Chief Minister of Kolkata, Jyoti Basu to Sukh Ram, the then Union communications minister, in July 1995.

Later Modi formed Spice Communications, a joint-venture with Telekom-Malaysia (now Axiata) which went on to become the leading telecom operator in Northern and Southern India. In 2000, Modi established Cellebrum (now Spice Digital), a mobile value-added services company for telecom operators. In 2004, he founded Spice Hotspot, the first Indian mobile retail chain. Spice Mobiles was among the earliest producers of Indian-branded handsets. In June 2008, he exited the telecom business in a deal with Idea Cellular, at that time the fourth largest mergers and acquisitions deal involving an Indian entity.

In 2009, Modi acquired a major stake in i2i, a listed company in Singapore Stock Exchange, renaming it S-i2i, (now SEVAK LTD.),) a regional distributor and provider of info-communication products and services in Singapore and Indonesia.

In 2013, Modi was included in Singapore's 50 Richest List by Forbes. In the same year, he dropped use of the name 'Spice' in favour of 'Smart'. He also entered into the entertainment industry as co-producer of the film OMG!, and producer of the tele-serial Buddha.

In 2015, Smart Group entered the wellness and healthcare sector, partnering with multiple global wellness groups including the American Academy of Anti-Aging Medicine (A4M), the Global Wellness Institute, and Fountain Life. The group's plans include developing wellness communities, a virtual wellness platform and preventive healthcare centres, such as the Modi Yoga Retreat in Rishikesh, Noida in Uttar Pradesh, and the Smart Metabolic Anti-Aging centre in New Delhi.

SEVAK LTD. has partnered with Uber to operate a fully commercially-owned electric vehicle fleet in Singapore.

Since 2019, Modi has been Global Chairman of the Foreign Investors India Forum (FIIF), an initiative supported by international affiliates and most domestic chambers of commerce to promote foreign investment into India.

Social philanthropy
In January 2013, Modi founded the Global Citizen Forum, a progressive social organisation with the mission statement of creating "One World Beyond Gender, Religion and Nationality". The organisation has held several events around the world, including at the United Nations headquarters in New York City.

Personal life 
Modi is married to Veena Modi and they have three children.

Filmography

As co-producer 
 2010, No Problem: co-produced with Rajat Rawail and Anil Kapoor
 2012, OMG – Oh My God!: co-produced with Vikram Malhotra. It won the 'Best Hindi Film Award' by Institute for Research and Documentation in  Social Sciences and 'Best Adapted Screenplay' in 60th National Film Awards.

As producer 

 2013, Buddha is a historical drama based on the life of Buddha that shows how a prince 'Siddhartha', became 'Buddha', aired on Sunday, 8 September 2013 at 11 am on Zee Tv and Doordarshan.
 (Upcoming) Adi Shankaracharya, a historical drama based on the life of the Hindu saint Sri Adi Shankaracharya, who is credited with the revival of Hinduism in the 8th century CE. Serial air date & Broadcast partner - TBD.

Books 
 Hinduism The Universal Truth (1993)
 Performance — A Manager's Challenge (1995)
 One God (2000)
 India and Hinduism (2002)

Awards and honours

 In 1997, Modi was appointed as chairman of the Cellular Operators Association of India.
 In 2000, Modi was appointed as the coordinator for Indian subcontinent for Millennium World Peace Summit by United Nations.
In 2004, the US House of Representatives issued a proclamation in appreciation of Modi's efforts to promote deeper understanding between the countries and congratulated him on his innovations and humanitarian efforts worldwide
2009, Modi received a special commendation from the then Singapore Minister-Mentor Lee Kuan Lew on the occasion of the fifth anniversary of the Lee Kuan Institute of Public Policy. 
 In 2013, 'Ambassador of Peace Award' conferred by the Universal Peace Foundation.
 In 2015, 'Lifetime Achievement Luminary Award' by Channel News Asia, Singapore. 
In 2017, 'Entrepreneur of the Year Award' by Singapore Indian Chamber of Commerce. 
In 2018, 'Global Thought Leader  for Global Peace Award' by Stardust.
In 2019, Modi was appointed the Honorary President for World Federation of United Nation Associations.

References

External links
 http://www.business-standard.com/india/news/b-k-modi-buys-51-stake-in-wall-street-finance/20/55/72858/on
 http://www.siliconindia.com/shownews/BK_Modis_10_Million_penthouse_hits_headlines_in_Singapore-nid-56641-cid-TNI.html
 http://www.dnaindia.com/money/report_telecom-too-big-for-one-ministry-says-bk-modi_1403112 
 http://www.business-standard.com/india/news/a-brand-for-himself/431524/  
https://www.outlookindia.com/newsscroll/singapore-applauds-indian-businesses-contribution/1280963
https://brandequity.economictimes.indiatimes.com/news/business-of-brands/a-witness-to-history-remembering-indias-first-mobile-call-25-years-ago/77319209

Banaras Hindu University alumni
Marshall School of Business alumni
Businesspeople from Delhi
People from Modinagar
1949 births
Living people
Modi family